The University of the Cumberlands is a private Christian university in Williamsburg, Kentucky. About 18,000 students are enrolled at the university.

History
University of the Cumberlands, first called Williamsburg Institute, was founded on January 7, 1889.At the 1887 annual meeting of the Mount Zion Association, representatives from 18 eastern Kentucky Baptist churches discussed plans to provide higher education in the Kentucky mountains. The college was incorporated by the Kentucky state legislature on April 6, 1888. In 1907 the school bought the three buildings of Highland College, and in 1913, Williamsburg Institute's name was changed to Cumberland College. The name reflected the institution's location along the Cumberland River and its proximity to Cumberland Falls and the Cumberland Gap. From its inception, the institution has been affiliated with the Southern Baptist Convention and its mission has been to educate and prepare leaders for service to the greater community. On the basis of being controlled by the Kentucky Baptist Convention and being bound by its policies, the university has requested and received exemptions from Title IX in the areas of "admissions, recruitment, education programs or activities, and employment", allowing it to discriminate in those fields based on its views regarding "marriage, sex outside of marriage, sexual orientation, gender identity, pregnancy, and abortion." University of the Cumberlands sought, and received, a dissolution with the Kentucky Baptist Convention during the annual convention on November 12, 2018.

Although founded as a senior college, in 1918 Cumberland College officially became a junior college. The college received its first accreditation from the Southern Association of Colleges and Schools (SACS) in 1931. In 1956 the Board of Trustees began bringing the college back to senior college status. The junior year was added in 1959-60 and the senior year in 1960–1961. SACS granted initial accreditation to the institution as a senior college in December 1964. Since then, SACS has reaffirmed the college's accreditation in 1974, 1985, 1995, and 2006. It is next scheduled for reaffirmation in 2016.

Cumberland College received authority to award its first graduate degree, the Master of Arts in education (MAED) on April 6, 1988. Graduate education has since become an integral part of the institution. In 2005, the institution received authorization from SACS to offer the Master of Arts in Teaching degree (MAT). This action was followed in 2006 with permission from the SACS Commission on Colleges to offer both the MAED and MAT degrees fully online. More recently in 2008, the commission also authorized the granting of the MBA degree, the Ed.S. degree, as well as the institution's first doctoral degree, an Ed.D. in Educational Leadership. Master's programs in Professional Counseling and in Physician Assistant Studies were approved by SACS in 2009, and the Master of Arts in Christian Studies in 2010.

On July 1, 2005, after action by the Board of Trustees, Cumberland College became the University of the Cumberlands. The university is authorized by the Commonwealth of Kentucky to operate as a nonprofit corporation with perpetual duration and is licensed by the Kentucky Council on Postsecondary Education (CPE) to grant the degrees currently offered through July 2017. The institution is also recognized by the Commission on Colleges of SACS as a Level V institution and thus accredited to offer up to three doctoral programs. Currently it offers three doctoral degrees: Ed.D. in Educational Leadership, Ed.D. in Counselor Education, and Ph.D. in Psychology.

It was originally known as Williamsburg Institute, then as Cumberland College, and now as University of the Cumberlands.

Ten presidents have led the college including William James Johnson; E. E. Wood; John Newton Prestridge; Gorman Jones, acting president; A. R. Evans, acting president; Charles William Elsey; James Lloyd Creech; J. M. Boswell; James H. Taylor and Larry L. Cockrum.

On October 3, 2014, university President James Taylor announced that then-Vice President for Academic Affairs Larry Cockrum would take over day-to-day operations of the university after the board of trustees meeting on October 15, 2014. Taylor also announced his retirement as president effective October 15, 2015 with the recommendation that Cockrum be named university president effective October 16, 2015. On that date, Taylor would assume the honorary title of university chancellor. The board of trustees officially approved the succession plan on October 15, 2014, giving Cockrum a seven-year contract and the title of Chief Executive Officer & President-Elect. The board of trustees, in a unanimous vote, officially named Cockrum university president on October 15, 2015.

Notable alumni include two governors, five military generals, and five college and university presidents.

AAUP censure
In 2005, the American Association of University Professors (AAUP) censured the university, finding that then-President James Taylor coerced Professor Robert Day into resigning because he had opposed Taylor's proposed staff layoffs on an off-campus website. The AAUP concluded that "The policies of Cumberland College, including the grievance procedure, do not provide for faculty hearings of any kind. College policies and practices preclude any effective faculty role in academic governance and contribute to an atmosphere that stifles the freedom of faculty to question and criticize administrative decisions and actions." The AAUP noted that current and former faculty members "do not feel free to address topics of college concern in any forum" and "described a climate of fear about what faculty members may say and do, a fear based on what they know or have been told has happened to others." Those interviewed "expressed a particular fear that criticizing the administration and its operation of the college could place a faculty member's appointment in jeopardy."

Beliefs and policies on homosexuality
The university's beliefs about and policies on homosexuality have proven controversial on many occasions. In 2006, the Kentucky state budget included $10 million of state debt to construct a pharmacy building on the university's Whitley County campus. Additionally, $1 million for scholarships for the pharmacy program were included. The $10 million building was to be funded out of a $100 million pool of money titled the "infrastructure for economic development fund for coal-producing counties." Money to repay the bond issuance would come from coal severance taxes. The Kentucky Fairness Alliance asked Governor Ernie Fletcher to veto the $11 million that state lawmakers approved for a planned pharmacy school. A gay Kentucky State Senator, Ernesto Scorsone, has indicated that he would oppose spending the funds already allocated for a new pharmacy school for the university based on the Johnson situation, stating "We should not be budgeting bigotry." "If the University of the Cumberlands does not change its policies and practices, we will have a state benefit that is only available to heterosexuals," Scorsone said. An additional complication was that the Accreditation Council for Pharmacy Education, the accrediting agency for all American pharmacy schools, explicitly prohibits discrimination against gays. Its guideline stated that approved schools must have a policy on student affairs, including admissions and progression, that assures non-discrimination on the basis of race, religion, gender, lifestyle, national origin, or disability. As of July 1, 2007, this was revised to include the phrase "sexual orientation."

That same year, undergraduate student Jason Johnson of Lexington, Kentucky was forced to withdraw from the university after mentioning that he is gay on the social networking site MySpace.com. Then-university president James H. Taylor said in a written statement, "At University of the Cumberlands, we hold students to a higher standard than does society in general...University of the Cumberlands isn't for everyone. We tell prospective students about our high standards before they come." The student handbook, as revised in 2005, states that students can be removed from campus for participating in pre-marital sex or promoting homosexuality — a policy which Johnson's attorney alleged was added after Johnson decided to go to school at UC. A week and a half after initially withdrawing from the university, Johnson's attorney and the university reached a settlement allowing Johnson to complete his coursework for the semester and restoring his previous grades rather than downgrading them to failing. The university agreed to not report to other universities that Johnson was expelled. In addition, Johnson waived his right to sue the university, although he retained his right to file a grievance with the Department of Education or the Southern Association for Colleges and Schools.

In 2007, the pro-Gay and Lesbian rights group Soulforce brought its 2007 Equality Ride to Cumberlands' campus. According to the group's website, "through dialogue with administrators, faculty and students, the young activists of the 2007 Equality Ride will make clear the harmful effects of the false notion that homosexuality is a 'sickness and a sin.' To make public their case for equality, the young activists on the Equality Ride will hold vigils, Bible studies, class discussions, community forums, and press conferences."

According to the university, an offer was extended to the group to be located in the middle level of the Boswell Campus Center, but Soulforce rejected those terms. However, according to Soulforce, an offer from the university was quickly withdrawn because of a miscommunication and the university later refused to agree to terms in writing. Two University of the Cumberlands students were arrested by Williamsburg police on a charge of failure to disperse, along with a member of the Soulforce group, for trespassing and failure to disperse when they stopped on the sidewalk of Main Street, which runs through the campus.

The college was granted an exception to Title IX in 2015 which allows it to legally discriminate against LGBT students for religious reasons.

Campus

Notable buildings
Roburn Hall: The first building on the campus, Roburn Hall has been used as a classroom building and a women's and men's residence hall. It is now a women's residence hall.
Gillespie Hall: Originally called Johnson Hall, the women's residence was the second building built by Williamsburg Institute.
Mahan Hall: Built in 1907 as Felix Hall, Mahan was the first men's residence.
Clyde V. and Patricia Bennett Building: Formerly known as the Gray Brick Building, the Bennett Building was built in 1906 by Highland College. Highland and Cumberland merged in 1907.
Ruby Gatliff Archer President's Home: Built in 1905 as a replica of the "Kentucky Home" at the 1904 World's Fair in St. Louis. It is the residence of the president of the university.
Edward L. Hutton School of Business: Built in 2004 as a replica of Independence Hall.
Cumberland Inn and Conference Center: Hotel and conference center run by the school. Primarily employs UC students.
 Patriot Steakhouse, formerly the Athenaeum Restaurant: Highly rated restaurant inside the Cumberland Inn. Reviewed in Eating Your Way Across Kentucky: 101 Must Places To Eat (2006).
The Cumberland Inn Museum is operated by the school, located in the Cumberland Inn. It includes the Henkelmann Life Science Collection, the Carl Williams Cross Museum (one of the world's largest collections of crosses) and the University of the Cumberlands Archives.
Ward and Regina Correll Science Complex: In May 2007, $1 million expansion of the Science Complex was started. The new addition is a replica of Thomas Jefferson's Monticello mansion. Classes began in the Correll Science Complex in January 2009.
Lenora Fuson Harth Hall: New men's residence in the former location of Boswell Park, adjacent to Gillespie Hall. Construction began in August 2007. The hall opened in spring 2009.
 
Plans are also underway for an addition to the Boswell Campus Center and remodeling the current structure. These plans include a student recreation center complete with a rock wall, along with adding a thatched roof in order to blend in with the other buildings on campus. Phase 1 began in May, 2010.

Academics

In 2004 the current college President, Larry Cockrum, was caught up in an academic scandal because he was awarded a fake degree from Crescent City Christian College. The incident occurred while Cockrum was employed at the University of the Ozarks. The professor who questioned this degree was fired, while Larry Cockrum was allowed to resign. Cockrum later received a Ph.D. in higher education administration from Vanderbilt University and a post-graduate certification from Harvard University.

The university is divided into four colleges: Cumberland College (the university's undergraduate school), the Hutton School of Business/Management, the Hutton Center for Leadership Studies, and the Graduate/Professional Education program.

University of the Cumberlands is accredited by the Commission of Colleges of the Southern Association of Colleges and Schools to award baccalaureate, master's, and doctoral degrees.

Undergraduate programs

Cumberlands offers approximately 45 major undergraduate programs of study, as well as a variety of minor programs. UC recently began offering majors in Journalism and Public Relations, Criminal Justice, and Spanish.

Cumberlands offers 12 academic national honor societies for students in several majors.

Graduate programs

The university offers several master's degrees, including programs in Education (MAEd), Psychology (MAPC), Business Administration (MBA), Physician Assistant Studies (MSPA), and Christian Studies (MACS), as well as an Educational Specialist program.  It also offers several PhD programs, as well as an EdD program.

Northern Kentucky Campus

In addition to the main campus in Williamsburg, UC operates a Northern Kentucky facility in Florence, Kentucky, just south of Cincinnati, Ohio. The location was originally secured to offer more clinical rotations in mental healthcare for doctoral psychology students. This satellite campus currently houses the School of Lifelong Learning and the Ph.D. Program in Clinical Psychology.  The university has also indicated that this campus may be the eventual home of the Master's program in Physician Assistant Studies.

Athletics
The Cumberlands athletic teams are called the Patriots (after switching from their original nickname, the Indians). The university is a member of the National Association of Intercollegiate Athletics (NAIA), primarily competing in the Mid-South Conference (MSC) for most of its sports since the 1995–96 academic year; while its men's lacrosse team competes in the Appalachian Athletic Conference (AAC). The Patriots previously competed in the Kentucky Intercollegiate Athletic Conference (KIAC; currently known as the River States Conference (RSC) since the 2016–17 school year) from 1966–67 to 1994–95.

Cumberlands competes in 28 intercollegiate varsity sports: Men's sports include baseball, basketball, bowling, cross country, football, golf, lacrosse, soccer, swimming & diving, tennis, track & field and wrestling; while women's sports include basketball, bowling, cross country, golf, lacrosse, soccer, softball, swimming & diving, tennis, track & field, volleyball and wrestling; and co-ed sports include archery, cheerleading, dance, and eSports.

Student life

The university has a low-power radio station, WCCR-LP, a campus newspaper, The Patriot,  and a local cable television station, UCTV channel 19. It also has a forensics (debate) team and an academic team.

The university typically has two theatre productions each year, one play (commonly in the spring, though reversed for the 2008 semesters) and one musical (currently in the spring, previously in the fall).

The university has other extracurricular student activities, including Campus Activity Board (CAB), chapters of College Republicans and College Democrats, Fellowship of Christian Athletes (FCA), Residence Hall Councils, Student Government Association, Baptist Campus Ministries (BCM), and many other clubs and organizations.

UC has 12 chapters of national honor societies in fields such as Biology (Beta Beta Beta), First Year Students (Alpha Lambda Delta) Theology and Religion (Theta Alpha Kappa), Business (Sigma Beta Delta and Phi Beta Lambda), and other academic fields.

University of the Cumberlands provides opportunities for campus ministry through Baptist Campus Ministries, Appalachian Ministries, Mountain Outreach, and Campus Family and Life groups.

All undergraduate students participate in community service before they graduate, developing a 40-hour community service project through their "Lead 101" class. Students who accumulate 200 or more hours of community service during their time at UC are designated "Hutton Scholars" and presented with certificates. Such students are recognized at their commencement ceremonies and can request a "leadership transcript". Many campus organizations provide opportunities for community service, including Student Government Association, the Academic Resource Center (ARC), Campus Activity Board, The Patriot campus newspaper, and Resident Assistant positions.

Notable alumni
Ergun Caner, former president of Liberty Theological Seminary, part of Liberty University
Bert T. Combs, former Governor of Kentucky
Mike Duncan, former chairman of the Republican National Committee and current governor of the United States Postal Service
Edward Liddie, judoka, 1984 Summer Olympics bronze medalist in judo 
Toccara Montgomery, All-American wrestler; 2004 Summer Olympics finishing 7th
Edwin P. Morrow, former Governor of Kentucky
Jean Ritchie, folk musician, singer, and songwriter who played the Appalachian dulcimer
Betty L. Siegel, former president of Kennesaw State University one of the longest serving woman presidents of an American University 
Eugene Siler, former U.S. Representative from Kentucky
Rick Stansbury, current men's basketball coach at Western Kentucky University, former men's basketball coach at Mississippi State University, was graduate assistant at Cumberland from 1983 to 1984
Dick Tunney, contemporary Christian artist/songwriter
Leo White, judoka, 1984 and 1992 Summer Olympics
Wendall Williams, NFL wide receiver
Cat Zingano, All-American wrestler; professional mixed martial arts fighter, currently competing in the UFC's bantamweight division

References

External links

 Official website
 Official athletics website

 
Universities and colleges accredited by the Southern Association of Colleges and Schools
Educational institutions established in 1889
University of the Cumberlands
Buildings and structures in Whitley County, Kentucky
Education in Whitley County, Kentucky
University of the Cumberlands
1889 establishments in Kentucky